Minuscule 479 (in the Gregory-Aland numbering), δ 2491 (in the Soden numbering), is a Greek minuscule manuscript of the New Testament, on parchment. Palaeographically it has been assigned to the 13th century. Scrivener labelled it by number 542. It was adapted for liturgical use. Marginalia are not complete.

Description 

The codex contains the whole text of the New Testament except Book of Apocalypse on 231 parchment leaves (size ). It is written in one column per page, 29 lines per page.
The order of books: Gospels, Acts of the Apostles, Catholic epistles, and Pauline epistles.

The text of the Gospel has not additional division according to the smaller Ammonian Sections; no references to the Eusebian Canons.

It has the Euthalian Apparatus to the Acts, Catholic, and Pauline epistles.

It contains the Pericope Adulterae (John 7:53-8:11), but it was marked with an obelus.

Text 

The Greek text of the codex is a representative of the Byzantine text-type. Hermann von Soden classified it to the textual family Family Kr. Aland placed it in Category V.
According to the Claremont Profile Method it represents textual family Family Kr in Luke 1, Luke 10, and Luke 20. It creates also a textual cluster 479.

History 

Currently the manuscript is dated by the INTF to the 13th century.

Formerly the manuscript belonged to the monastery του μετεωρου. The manuscript once belonged to Bishop of Caesarea Palaestina. It was bought by in 1837 by Christopher Wordsworth († 1885), Bishop of Lincoln, and bears a stamp Biblioteca Suchtelen (Russian Ambassador at Stockholm).

The manuscript was examined and collated by Scrivener (542), who published its text in 1852. The manuscript was added to the list of New Testament manuscripts by Scrivener. Gregory saw it in 1883. Gregory gave the number 479 to it.

The manuscript is currently housed in the Cadbury Research Library, University of Birmingham (Mingana Gr. 3).

See also 

 List of New Testament minuscules
 Biblical manuscript
 Textual criticism

References

Further reading 

 F. H. A. Scrivener, A Full and Exact Collation of About 20 Greek Manuscripts of the Holy Gospels (Cambridge and London, 1852), p. XLII. (as l)
 F. H. A. Scrivener, An Exact Transcript of the Codex Augiensis (Cambridge and London, 1859), p. 63. (as g)
 J. N. Birdsal, Greek Hagiographical Manuscripts in the Library of the Selly Oak Colleges, Anal. Boll 86 (1968), pp. 333–336.

Greek New Testament minuscules
13th-century biblical manuscripts